Palola viridis, (or Eunice viridis) commonly known as the palolo worm, Samoan palolo worm, balolo, wawo, or nyale, is a Polychaeta species from the waters of some of the Pacific islands, including Samoa, Tonga, Fiji, Vanuatu, and the islands of the Malay Archipelago (Indonesia , Timor-Leste and the Philippines ).

Life cycle

Reproduction involves mass spawning at night in spring or early summer (October – November in the Southern Hemisphere). A local red land crab descends to the sea the same night, the palolo is supposed to rise. The terminal parts of their bodies drop off and float over the surface of the water, releasing sperm and eggs. The mechanisms or triggers which induce spawning such that it occurs during nights of a waning moon, continuing for several nights, are not completely known. Exposure to sunlight destroys this "tail" part of the worm's body afterwards. The palolo worms' rising in Fiji is preceded by the descent of a local red land crab to the sea the same night. In Samoa a crab known as mali'o also descends to the sea around the palolo rising. Other sea creatures such as sharks and fishes come to spawn during the event.

Taxonomy
It is sometimes considered to be synonymous with Palola siciliensis.

Distribution
The palolo worm is found in tropical regions around various islands of the Pacific Ocean, including Samoa, Tonga, Fiji, Indonesia, Vanuatu, and some islands of the Philippines. They are variously known as palolo (Samoa and Tonga), balolo (Fiji), wawo or nyale (Indonesia), Within these tropical regions, the palolo worms are usually found in shallow waters where there is coral rubble for them to take shelter in.

Cultural use

Some Indigenous populations in regions where palolo occur deem the worm a delicacy. During their short-lived annual appearance in the last quarter of the moon in October and November or in February (Lombok, Indonesia), worms are gathered with nets or buckets, and are either eaten raw or cooked in several different ways.

In Samoa, the worms are revered as an excellent food source, hunting for them taking place seven days after the first full moon in October. Often bright blue in colour, the flavour is said to resemble a cross between mussels, abalone and oysters. They are sometimes eaten fresh, but usually fried with butter and onions and served with taro or banana chips.

On the island of Lombok in Indonesia, a traditional event called the Nyale Festival, or Bau Nyale (meaning "to catch the sea worms), is held between February and March. The event focuses on catching these worms, which are known as wawo. In local legend, the nyale are believed to be the reincarnation of Princess Mandalika, who had jumped into the sea to drown herself.

The spawning event is so important to the inhabitants of the Torres and Banks Islands of Vanuatu that it is featured in their lunar calendar.

References

Further reading

External links
 Image of the head of a palolo worm from the Smithsonian Institution
 Samoa Worm Sperm Spawns Annual Fiesta from National Geographic
 The Lunar Calendar of the Banks Islands

Invertebrates of American Samoa
Fauna of Fiji
Annelids
Polychaetes
Animals described in 1840
Taxonomy articles created by Polbot
Taxobox binomials not recognized by IUCN 
Samoan cuisine